Gimcheon University is a university located in Gimcheon, South Korea.

History
1978 Founded as "Gimcheon Business Junior College" by the Shincheon Board of Directors.
1998 Name changed to "Gimcheon College"
2000 Selected as "The Best College of Health Science(A+)" by the MOE&HRD and Korean Council for College Education.
2001 Designed as a "Business Incubation Supporting Institution" by the Small & Medium Business Administration
2002 Selected as an "Excellent Technology Supporting Institution" at the Inno-Tech Show by the Small & Medium Business Administration.
2003 Kang, Sung Ae took office as the third president.
2004 Selected as "The Best Group in Percentage of Employment"
2005 Selected for consortium of "Industry-College Cooperation" by the Small & Medium Business Administration.
2006 Designated an "Excellent College" at the National Local Innovation Show.
2007 Recognized by the Ministry of Education, Science and Technology to change its charter from college to university. Established the "International Language Education Center".
2008 Selected as "The Best Group (Group A) in percentage of employment" by the Korean Educational Development Institute.
2009 Received its charter as a university from the Ministry of Education, Science and Technology.
2010 Held first matriculation ceremony as Gimcheon University

International relationships
 Curtin University of Technology (AU) 1999
 The University of Newcastle (AU) 1999
 Hawaii Pacific University (US) 2000
 Yamano College of Aesthetics (JP) 2001
 Christchurch Polytechnic Institute of Technology (NZ) 2002
 The College of Marjon (UK) 2003
 Southwestern University (PH) 2005
 Cambridge College of Heilongjjang University (CN) 2005
 Biola University (US) 2005
 Qingdao Binhai University (CN) 2005
 Tashkent state Pedagogical University named after Nizami (UZ) 2007
 Tashkent State Institute of Oriental Studies (UZ) 2007
 Buryat State University (RU) 2007
 Vladivostok State University of Economics and Service (RU) 2007
 Taiyuan Tourism College (CN) 2008
 Kake Educational Institution (JP) 2008
 Liaoning University (CN) 2008
 Yeditepe University (TR) 2008
 Nanguo Business College (CN) 2008
 Chengdu University (CN) 2008
 Shandong College of Tourism & Hospitality (CN) 2008
 College of New Caledonia (CA) 2009
 Technical Technology Ulanngom College (MN) 2009
 Bataan Peninsula State University (PH) 2009
 Buntain Theological College (IN) 2009
 Loh Guan Lye Specialists Centre (MY) 2009
 Kathmandu University (NP) 2009
 Orkhon University (MN) 2010
 Baku State University (AZ) 2010
 Nakhchivan State University (AZ) 2010
 Southern College of Technology (TH) 2011
 Udomsuksa School (TH) 2011
 Arabaev Kyrgyz State University (KG) 2011
 California State University San Marcos (US) 2011
 Yichun University (CN) 2011
 Bloomfield College (US) 2011

External links
Gimcheon University official website

Gimcheon
Private universities and colleges in South Korea
Universities and colleges in North Gyeongsang Province
Educational institutions established in 1979
1979 establishments in South Korea